Connor Widdows (born January 27, 1992) is a former Canadian child actor. He appeared in the second and third film adaptation of the X-Men franchise, X2 and X-Men: The Last Stand, as Jones, a student at Professor Xavier's school who does not need sleep and can control television equipment by blinking. The character was not based on an existing mutant from the X-Men comics.

Widdows has previously appeared as Boxey on the Sci Fi Channel television program Battlestar Galactica.  Widdows was slated to make several appearances as Boxey, yet never made it past the miniseries and the first few episodes.  As executive producer Ronald D. Moore put it, "Boxey died a hard nasty death on the page and in the editing room, and was last seen haunting the deleted scenes area of the Sci Fi Channel website".

In 2003, Widdows played Cody Banks' younger brother Alex Banks in the movie Agent Cody Banks. He maintained the role in the 2004 sequel, Agent Cody Banks 2: Destination London.

Personal life
Widdows has one younger sister, Sarah, who is also into acting.

His aunt is award winning casting director and filmmaker Coreen Mayrs, who has been involved in casting many of the films in which Widdows appears.

Filmography

References

External links

1992 births
Canadian male child actors
Canadian male film actors
Canadian male television actors
Living people
Male actors from Vancouver